Andy Fleming (born December 27, 1974) is an American former college soccer player and former head coach for Xavier University in the Big East Conference. Fleming has previously served as an assistant coach for Northwestern and Boston University's men's soccer programs.

Career

Playing 
Fleming played eight years of competitive soccer. From 1990 to 1994 he played high school soccer for Archbishop Williams High School. There Fleming was a four-year starter for their varsity soccer program. In 2004, Fleming would be inducted into their high school's Hall of Fame.

After graduating from Archbishop, Fleming earned a scholarship to play college soccer for Marist College. There, Fleming was a four-year letterwinner, and served as team captain his junior and senior seasons.

Managerial 
On December 18, 2009, Fleming was named the head men's soccer coach for Xavier University. Fleming mutually parted ways with Xavier in 2021.

Head coaching record

References

External links 
 Xavier University bio

1974 births
Living people
Sportspeople from Boston
Soccer players from Boston
American soccer players
Association football midfielders
Marist Red Foxes men's soccer players
American soccer coaches
Boston University Terriers men's soccer coaches
Northwestern Wildcats men's soccer coaches
Xavier Musketeers men's soccer coaches
Archbishop Williams High School alumni
Sportspeople from Braintree, Massachusetts